The Peace and Neutrality Party was a political party in Laos.

History
The party was established by Quinim Pholsena in 1956 after he was expelled from the National Progressive Party. In the supplementary elections in 1958 it won four seats after campaigning alongside the Lao Patriotic Front.

The electoral law was amended prior to the 1960 elections, introducing a requirement for candidates to have a degree. This disqualified most of the party's leadership and it failed to win a seat.

References

Defunct political parties in Laos
Political parties established in 1956
1956 establishments in Laos
Political parties with year of disestablishment missing